Great White (alternatively called Shark) is a 2000 horror film written and directed by Zac Reeder. The film is based on the 1916 shark attacks in New Jersey. The film's title was changed to Shark for the first United States home video release, but was kept the same internationally.

Plot
Based on the Jersey Shore attacks of 1916, a string of mysterious deaths begin to plague a small desert town. The events attract the attention of Professor Steven Miller (Richard Keats). At first, Sheriff Ross (Terry Arrowsmith) claims the incidents are the result of mountain animals - but the circumstances don't add up, and Miller is skeptical. With a shark sighting by a town drunk, and a chewed-up body that has washed ashore, Steven must convince the doubtful law enforcement that the waters of Laughlin, Nevada have been invaded by a twelve-foot great white shark.

Cast
Richard Keats as Steven Miller
Raja Collins as David Miller
Terry Arrowsmith as Sheriff Ross
Stephanie Allen as Nancy Miller
CJ Morrow as Sarge
Crocket Maricle as The Sergeant
Ryan Moe as Sam
Drew Wood as Joe
Michael Main as Jake
Zac Reeder as himself
Jay Link as himself
Juni Reeder as Officer

Release
The film was first released on DVD and VHS in the United States on August 22, 2000, through Leo Films, however, with distorted audio tracks and retitled. Shark was also released in Japan by Beam Entertainment, and in Germany through VZM. The film was re-released on February 11, 2014 in the United States under its original title Great White from RetroVision Entertainment, LLC. The DVD featured the correctly mixed English audio track and presents the film without any edits.

See also
List of killer shark films

References

External links 
SHARK at the Internet Movie Data Base
Leo Films Website

1998 films
American natural horror films
Films about sharks
Films about shark attacks
Films set in Nevada
Laughlin, Nevada
1990s English-language films
1990s American films